This is a list of historical pre-modern weapons grouped according to their uses, with rough classes set aside for very similar weapons. Some weapons may fit more than one category (e.g. the spear may be used either as a polearm or as a projectile), and the earliest gunpowder weapons which fit within the period are also included.

Offensive weapons

Melee weapons

Hand or fist weapons and fans
Single-handed weapons not resembling a straight dagger blade, usually wielded without wrist action; often protects the forearm.

 Bagh nakha, tiger claws (Indian)
 Brass knuckles, knuckle dusters (European)
 Cestus, bladed cestus, caestus, myrmex, sfere (Mediterranean)
 Deer Horn Knives (Chinese)
 Emeici (Chinese)
 Finger knife (African)
 Gauntlet (European)
 Indian parrying weapon
 Japanese fan, iron fan
 Katar, suwaiya (कटार) (Indian)
 Korean fan, mubuchae (무부채), tempered birch fan
 Larim fighting bracelet, nyepel (African)
 Maduvu, buckhorn parrying stick, maru (Indian)
 Pata, sword gauntlet (Indian)
 Push dagger, also see Katar (dagger) (Indian)
 Tekko (Japanese)
 Wind and fire wheels (Chinese)
 Moche Tiger claw (Peru)

Edged and bladed weapons

Thrusting and cutting weapons for melee combat. Col. D.H. Gordon's classification has been used where applicable.

Swords

Long swords were classified by Gordon as longer than 28 inches/71 cm.

Curved one-handed swords

 Ayudha katti (South and Southeast Asian)
 Butterfly sword (Chinese)
 Cutlass, hanger, hangar (European)
 Dao, beidao, zhibei dao (Chinese)
 Dao (Northeastern Indian)
 Dha (Southeast Asian)
 Dussack, disackn, dusack, dusagge, dusegg, dusegge, dysack, tesak, thuseckn, tuseckn (Although some list this weapon only as a wooden practice sword, this was a real weapon)
 Falchion (European)
 Hunting sword (European)
 Hwando (Korean)
 Kampilan (Philippinese, Southeast Asian)
 Karabela (European)
 Kastane (Sri Lankan)
 Khopesh, sappara, sickle sword (Egyptian, Middle Eastern)
 Kilij (North Indian, Middle Eastern)
 Klewang (Southeast Asian)
 Krabi (Southeast Asian)
 Liuyedao (Chinese)
 Mameluke (Middle Eastern)
 Messer, großmesser, hiebmesser, kriegsmesser, langes messer (German, European)
 Nimcha (African)
 Parang Nabur (Bornean)
 Piandao (Chinese)
 Pulwar (Middle Eastern)
 Sabre, briquet (European)
 Schweizersäbel (European)
 Scimitar, saif (Middle Eastern)
 Shamshir (Pakistani, North Indian, Middle Eastern)
 Shashka (Caucasian, Circassian)
 Surik (Indonesian)
 Szabla (Polish, Lithuanian)
 Talwar (Pakistanian, North Indian, Middle Eastern)
 Yanmaodao (Chinese)

Straight one-handed swords

 Arming sword, war sword (European)
 Backsword (European)
 Basket-hilted sword, schiavona, broadsword, mortuary sword, heavy cavalry sword (European)
 Chokutō (Japanese)
 Épée (European, although now a fencing practice weapon, it originally was a stiff, heavy, triangular bladed thrusting sword weighing about 30oz)
 Espada ropera or Rapier (European)
 Estoc (European)
 Firangi, firanghi (Central Asian)
 Flamberge (European)
 Flyssa (North African)
 Hwandudaedo (Korean)
 Ida (West African)
 Jian (Chinese)
 Kampilan (Philippinese)
 Kaskara (Central African)
 Katzbalger (German)
 Khanda (South Asian)
 Moplah (Southwestern Indian)
 Patag (Bhutanese)
 Rapier (European)
 Saingeom (Korean)
 Seax (European)
 Side sword (European)
 Sikin Panyang (Sumatran)
 Spadroon (European)
 Spatha (Mediterranean, Greek)
 Takoba (North African)
 Tibetan Jian (Middle Asian)
 Tsurugi (Japanese)
 Ulfberht (Frankish)

Curved two-handed swords

 Dōtanuki (Japanese)
 Falx (European, Thraco-Dacian)
 Katana (Japanese)
 Miao dao  (Chinese)
 Nandao (Chinese)
 Nihontō (Japanese)
 Panabas (Philippinese)
 Ssangsudo (Korean)
 Tachi (Japanese)
 Uchigatana (Japanese)

Hand-and-a-half and two-handed greatswords

 Assamese dao (Indian, Southeast Asian)
 Boar sword (European)
 Changdao (Chinese)
 Claidheamh da laimh, highland sword (European)
 Claymore, Scottish Gaelic for "great sword" (Scottish, European)
 Dadao (Chinese)
 Executioner's sword, heading sword, sword of justice (European)
 Flame-bladed sword, flambard, flammard, flammenschwert (European)
 Katana (Japanese)
 Longsword, bastard sword, espée bastarde, hand and a half sword (European)
 Nagamaki (Japanese)
 Nodachi, Ōdachi (Japanese)
 Parade sword, paratschwerter (European)
 Wodao (Chinese)
 Zanbatō (Japanese)
 Zhanmadao (Chinese)
 Zweihänder, great sword, espadon, spadone, tuck, montante, lowland sword, two handed sword, dopplehänder (European)

Shortswords
Delineated as 20-28 inches/51–71 cm total length.

Curved shortswords

 Aikuchi, haikuchi (Japanese)
 Akrafena (West African)
 Barong (Southeast Asian)
 Janbiya, jambiya, jambya, jambia, janbia (Middle Eastern)
 Kaduthala, Kerala (Indian)
 Khanjar (Middle Eastern)
 Kodachi (Japanese)
 Pinuti (Southeast Asian)
 Shikomizue (Japanese)
 Talibon (Southeast Asian)
 Wakizashi (Japanese)

Straight shortswords

 Bakatwa (Shona tribe of Southern Africa) 
 Baselard (European)
 Bilbo (European)
 Bolo, itak (Philippinese, Southeast Asian)
 Cinquedea, anelace (European)
 Colichemarde (European)
 Cossack dagger, Ottoman quama, kinjal, quama, kama (Middle Eastern)
 Gladius (Roman)
 Khanjali (Georgian, Caucasian)
 Luwuk (Javanese)
 Misericorde (European)
 Ninjato, Shinobi gatana  (Japanese)
 Small sword (European)
 Swiss dagger, holbein dagger, schweizerdegen (European)
 Xiphos, xifos (Greek)

Axe-like swords
Generally, convex blades used for heavy chopping or slashing.

 Aruval (South Indian)
 Bolo, itak (Philippinese, Asian)
 Falcata (Mediterranean)
 Golok (Southeast Asian)
 Harpe, harpi (Greek)
 Kopis (Greek)
 Kora (Southeast Asian)
 Kudi (Southeast Asian)
 Kukri, khukri (Nepalian)
 Machete (Spain, Latin America)
 Vettukathi (South Indian)
 Mahera (Greek)
 One handed Dacian falx, sica (Mediterranean, Greek)
 Parang Pandit (Southeast Asian)
 Sosun pattah (South Asian)
 Yatagan, yataghan (Middle Eastern)

Other swords

 Hook sword (Chinese)
 Kris, keris sundang, keris bahari (Indonesian)
 Nandaka, Nair, nayar (Indian)

Fighting knives and daggers

Sickles and sickle like knives
Generally short, concave blades used for heavy cutting.

 Arit (Maduresian, Indonesian)
 Karambit, kerambit, korambit (Minangkabauian, Indonesian)
 Kujang (Sundanese, Indonesian)
 Kukri (Indian)
 Mandau (Malaysian, Indonesian, Bornean, Bruneian)
 Pichangatti (Indian)
 Punyal (Philippinese, Southeast Asian)
 Sickle (Improvised, worldwide)
 Sudanese sickle knife (African)

Picks and pickaxes

 Chicken sickles (Chinese)
 Crowbill (European, Central Asian)
 Elephant goad, ankus, ankusha, bullhook, elephant hook (South and Southeast Asian)
 Hakapik (European)
 Horseman's pick, martel de fer, also a blunt weapon (European)
 Kama (Japanese)
 Mattock (Improvised, European)
 Pickaxe (Improvised, European)
 War hammer also a blunt weapon (European)

Axes

 Adze (Improvised, European)
 Bardiche (European)
 Battle axe (European)
 Bhuj with blade shaped like the dagger on a long shaft
 Broadaxe (European)
 Congolese axe (African)
 Dahomey axe club, also an effective blunt weapon (African)
 Danish axe, hafted axe, English long axe, Viking axe, Danish longer axe (European)
 Doloire (European)
 Fu (Chinese)
 Hand axe, ovate handaxe (Paleolithic)
 Hatchet (European)
 Igorot headhunting axe (Philippinese, Southeast Asian)
 Labrys, pelekys (Greek)
 Long-bearded axe (European)
 Masakari (Japanese)
 Nzappa zap also thrown (African)
 Ono (Japanese)
 Palstave (Bronze Age, improvised, European)
 Sagaris (Middle Eastern)
 Shepherd's axe, valaška (European)
 Sparth Axe (European)
 Tabarzin (Middle Eastern)
 Tomahawk, Spontoon Tomahawk, also thrown (American)
 Tlaximaltepoztli (American)
 Vechevoral (Middle Asian)

Truncheons and blunt weapons

Usually wielded with one or two hands at close quarters with striking motions, although some sharp-pointed truncheons like the sai were more often used for stabbing.

 Aklys (Osci tribe of Southern Italy)
 Bō (Japanese)
 Bokken (Japanese)
 Clubbing boomerang (Worldwide)
 Returning boomerang (Australian)
 Cambuk (Southeast Asian)
 Canne de combat (European)
 Chúi (Chinese)
 Club, baseball bat, stone club, truncheon, cudgel, bludgeon
 Crop (Worldwide)
 Eskrima Sticks, straight sticks (Southeast Asian)
 Flail (European)
 Gada (Indian)
 Gunstock war club also thrown (American)
 Gurz, Ottoman gurz (Middle Eastern)
 Hammer (Improvised)
 Hanbō (Japanese)
 Horseman's pick, horseman's hammer, martel de fer, also a pickaxe weapon (European)
 Jawbone war club (American)
 Jō (Japanese)
 Jutte, jitte (Japanese)
 Kanabō (Japanese)
 Knobkierrie, knopkierie, knobkerry (African)
 Kotiate (New Zealandian)
 Kurunthadi, churuvadi, kuruvadi, muchan, otta (Indian)
 Macana (American)
 Mace, spiked mace, flanged mace (European, Middle Asian)
 Macuahuitl, maquahuitl (American)
 Mallet (American)
 Mere used to strike, jab (New Zealandian)
 Morning star, goedendag, holy water sprinkler (European)
 Mughal (Central Asian)
 Ōtsuchi (Japanese)
 Patu, patuki (New Zealandian)
 Plançon a picot, planson (European)
 Quauholōlli (American)
 Roundhead (European)
 Rungu also thrown (African)
 Sai (Okinawan)
 Shestopyor, Pernach (Russian)
 Shillelagh (Irish)
 Short scepter, mace scepter (European)
 Sledgehammer, maul (Improvised, European)
 Stone war club (American)
 Suburito (Japanese)
 Sword mace 鐧 (Chinese)
 Tambo, tanbo (Okinawan)
 Tekkan (Japanese)
Tekpi (Malaysia)
 Tewhatewha (New Zealandian)
 Tonfa (Okinawan)
 Waddy, Nulla Nulla (Australian)
 War hammer also a pickaxe weapon (European)
 Wooden war club, sharp headed version and curve headed version (American)
 Wrench (Improvised)
 Yawara, pasak, yawara bo, dulodulo (Japanese, Southeast Asian)
 Yubi-bo (Japanese)

Polearms and spears

Wielded mainly with two hands. Primarily for melee with sweeping, thrusting, and or hooking motions.

Blunt staves

 Bâton français (European)
 Bō (Japanese)
 Eku (Okinawan)
 Gun (Chinese)
 Jō (Japanese)
 Lathi (Indian)
 Naboot, shoum, nabboot, asa, asaya (Middle Eastern)
 Quarterstaff (European)
 Shareeravadi (Middle Asian)
 Taiaha (New Zealandian)

Spears

Thrown spears and javelins are listed under ranged weapons.

 Ahlspiess, awl pike (European)
 Aklys (Osci tribe of Southern Italy)
 Atgeir (European)
 Boar spear (European)
 Brandistock, feather staff, buttafuore (European)
 Dangpa chang also thrown (Korean)
 Dory (Greek)
 Hasta (Roman)
 Hoko yari (Japanese)
 Iklwa (Zulu tribe of South Africa)
 Jukjangchangbo, daijichang, toupjang, nangsun, dongyemochang, chichang, sabarichang, yangjimochang (Korean)
 Lance (European)
 Menavlion, menavlon (Greek)
 Migration Period spear, geirr, gaizaz, gar, ger, framea (European)
 Military fork (European)
 Pike (English)
 Pitchfork (Improvised)
 Qiang (Chinese)
 Ranseur, rawcon, runka (European)
 Saintie (Middle Asian)
 Sang (Indian)
 Sarissa (Greek)
 Sibat, bangkaw, palupad, sumbling (Southeast Asian)
 Sovnya (Russian)
 Spetum (European)
 Swordstaff (European)
 Trident
 Trishula (Indian, Southeast Asian)
 Yari (Japanese)

Polearms with axe-like blades

 Arbir (Southeast Asian)
 Bardiche (European)
 Bec de corbin, bec de faucon (European)
 Bill, English bill, bill hook, bill guisarme (European)
 Bisento (Japanese)
 Chacing staff (European)
 Dagger-axe, ko (Chinese)
 Danish axe, hafted axe, English long axe, Viking axe, Danish longer axe (European)
 Epsilon axe (European, Middle Eastern)
 Fauchard (European)
 Glaive (European)
 Guan (kwan) dao (Chinese)
 Guisarme (European)
 Halberd (European)
 Jedwart stave (European)
 Ji (Chinese)
 Lochaber axe (European)
 Long handled nagamaki (Japanese)
 Man catcher (European)
 Monk's spade (Chinese)
 Naginata (Japanese)
 Ngao (Southeast Asian)
 Nulbjakchang, galgorichang (Korean)
 Ox tongue spear (European)
 Partisan, partizan (European)
 Pollaxe, poleaxe (European)
 Pudao (Chinese)
 Romphea, romfea (Greek)
 Sasumata (Japanese)
 Scythe (Improvised)
 Sodegarami (Japanese)
 Tepoztopilli (American)
 Tongi, four pointed tongi, two pointed (South Asian)
 Tsukubō (Japanese)
 Two handed Dacian falx (Mediterranean, Greek)
 Voulge (European)
 War scythe

Polearms with spikes and hammers

 Bec de corbin (European)
 Lucerne hammer (European)
 Zhua (Chinese)

Ranged weapons

Thrown

Throwing blades and darts

 Chakram (Indian, Southeast Asian)
 Kunai (Improvised, Japanese)
 Mambele (African)
 Plumbata (European)
 Shuriken (Japanese)
 Swiss arrow (European)
 Throwing dart (Worldwide)
 Throwing knife (Worldwide)

Throwing spears and javelins

All could be used as spears, but were designed and primarily used for throwing.

 Angon (European)
 Assegai, assagai (African)
 Atlatl and darts (American, Paleolithic tribes)
 Falarica, phalarica (Mediterranean)
 Harpoon (Worldwide)
 Jangchang (Korean)
 Javelin (Mediterranean)
 Lancea (Mediterranean)
 Mesangylon (Greek)
 Metal bar, metal pipe (Improvised, Worldwide)
 Northern spear (Philippinese, Southeast Asian)
 Pilum (Roman)
 Soliferrum, saunion, soliferreum (Mediterranean)
 Spiculum (Roman)
 Vel (Indian)
 Verutum (Roman)
 Woomera, amirre (Australian)

Throwing axes
Could also be used as axe weapons, but were specifically designed for throwing.

 Francisca, francesca (European)
 Hunga munga, danisco, goleyo, njiga (African)
 Hurlbat, whirlbat (European)
 Kapak siam (Asian)
 Nzappa zap (African)
 Tomahawk also an axe weapon (American)

Throwing balls

 Bolas, ayllo, liwi, qilumitautit (Central American, South American, Arctic)
 Slungshot not to be confused with a slingshot (Improvised, Worldwide)
 Stone, rock, lithos (Improvised, Worldwide)

Throwing sticks

 Boomerang (Australian, Worldwide)
 Knobkierrie, knopkierie, knobkerry, also a blunt weapon (African)
 Rungu (East African)
 Stick, branch (Improvised, Worldwide)

Gunpowder weapons

 Abus howitzer (Turkish)
 Arquebus, caliver, hackbut, harkbus, harquebus (European)
 Bajozutsu pistol (Japanese)
 Basilisk cannon (European)
 Baton a feu hand cannon (French)
 Bedil tumbak hand cannon (Indonesian)
 Blunderbuss, donderbus (European)
 Bo-hiya rocket arrow (Japanese)
 Bombard (European, Middle Eastern, Chinese)
 Byzantine bombard (Greek)
 Byzantine fire tube (cannon) (Greek)
 Byzantine rocket launcher (Greek)
 Cannon (European, Middle Eastern, Chinese)
 Cetbang cannon (Indonesian, Southeast Asian)
 Che Dian Chong musket (Chinese)
 Chongtong cannon (Chinese)
 Culverin cannon (French)
 Dardanelles bombard (Turkish)
 Dulle Griet bombard (Belgian)
 Ekor lotong cannon (Malaysian)
 Falconet, falcon cannon (European)
 Fauconneau cannon (European)
 Faule Grete bombard (Polish)
 Faule Mette bombard (German)
 Fire arrow, rocket arrow (Chinese)
 Fire lance, Huo Qiang lance hand cannon (Chinese)
 Grose Bochse bombard (German)
 Hand cannon (European, Middle Eastern, Chinese)
 Hand mortar (European)
 Heilongjiang hand cannon (Chinese)
 Hu Dun Pao cannon (Chinese)
 Huo Che rocket arrow launcher (Chinese)
 Huo Chong hand cannon (Chinese)
 Hwacha rocket arrow launcher (Korean)
 Istinggar arquebus (Indonesian)
 Java arquebus (Indonesian)
 Jiaozhi arquebus (Vietnamese)
 Korean cannon
 Lantaka, rentaka cannon (Philippinese, Indonesian, Malaysian, Southeast Asian)
 Lela cannon (Malaysian)
 Meriam kecil hand cannon (Indonesian, Malaysian)
 Mons Meg bombard (Belgian)
 Mortar (European, Middle Eastern, Chinese)
 Musket (European, Middle Eastern, Chinese)
 Musketoon (European, Middle Eastern, Chinese)
 Orban bombard (Turkish)
 Organ gun, ribauldequin, ribauiidkin, ribault, rabauld (European)
 Petronel hand cannon (European)
 Pierrier a boite cannon (French)
 Pistol (European)
 Pot de fer cannon (French)
 Prangi, pranki, pranku, paranki, pranga, parangi, prangu, parangu, piranki, pirangi, farangi, firingi, firingiha cannon (Turkish, Indian)
 Pumhart von Steyr bombard (Austrian)
 Saker cannon (European)
 San Yan Chong three barrel hand cannon (Chinese)
 Shou Chong hand cannon (Chinese)
 Singijeon, shinkichon rocket arrow (Korean)
 Tanegashima arquebus (Japanese)
 Tarasnice cannon (European)
 Toradar, torador arquebus (Indian)
 Tu Huo Qiang hand cannon (Chinese)
 Veuglaire cannon (French)
 Wall gun, janjal, jingal, gingal (European, Middle Eastern, Chinese)
 Wankou Chong cannon (Chinese)
 Xanadu cannon (Chinese)
 Xi Xia cannon (Chinese)
 Xun Lei Chong spear five barrel revolver musket (Chinese)

Composite projectile weapons
Having a built-in gun or ranged weapon combined with some other type of weapon.

 Ax match and wheellock (European axe with five barrels under a removable blade)
 Carbine axe (European axe)
 Halberd double barreled wheellock (European halberd)
 Mace wheellock (European mace)
 Matchlock axe dagger (European axe, dagger, matchlock combination)
 Pistol sword (European sword)
 War hammer wheellock (European pick hammer)

Firing mechanisms

 Doglock
 Flintlock
 Matchlock
 Snaphance
 Snaplock
 Snap matchlock
 Wheellock

Slings

 Kestros, cestrus, cestrosfendoni, kestrosfedoni (Greek)
 Sling (Worldwide)
 Stave sling, fustibale (Mediterranean)

Bows

Longbows

 Daikyu (Japanese)
 Decurve bow
 Deflex bow
 English longbow, warbow
 Flatbow
 Self bow
 Welsh longbow, warbow

Recurved bows

 Cable-backed bow
 Composite bow
 Hungarian bow
 Perso-Parthian bow

Short bows and reflex bows

 Gungdo, hwal (Korean)
 Hankyu (Japanese)
 Mongol bow
 Turkish bow

Crossbows

 Arbalest, arblast (European)
 Bullet bow, English bullet bow, pellet crossbow (European)
 Cheiroballistra, hirovallistra hand ballista (Roman, Greek)
 Crossbow (European, Chinese)
 Gastraphetes, gastrafetis (Greek)
 Pistol crossbow
 Repeating crossbow, chu ko nu, zhuge (Chinese)
 Skane lockbow (European)
 Stone bow (European)

Blowguns

 Blowgun, blowpipe, blow tube (Worldwide)
 Fukiya (Japanese)

Projectile weapons

 Ballista (European, Asian)
 Ballista elephant (Angkor)
 Carroballista (Roman)
 Catapult (European, Asian)
 Catapulta (Roman)
 Efthytonon catapult (Greek)
 Hu Dun Pao trebuchet (Chinese)
 Mangonel (Chinese)
 Onager (Roman)
 Oxybeles, oxyvelis ballista (Greek)
 Palintonon catapult (Greek)
 Polybolos, polyvolos repeating ballista (Greek)
 Trebuchet (European, Asian)

Flamethrowers

 Pen Huo Qi flamethrower (Chinese)
 Greek flamethrower

Flexible weapons

Whips
Used for whipping.

 Bullwhip (Worldwide)
 Buntot Pagi (Philippinese)
 Cat o' nine tails (European)
 Chain whip, jiujiebian, samjitbin, qijiebian (Chinese)
 Knout (Eastern European)
 Nagyka, nagaika, nogaika (Eastern European)
 Sjambok, fimbo, imvubu, kiboko, kurbash, litupa, mnigolo, chicotte (African)
 Small whips, crops (Worldwide)
 Stockwhip (Australian)
 Urumi, chuttuval (Indian)

Sectional and composite
Having multiple handles or holdable sections.

 Nunchaku (Okinawan)
 Tabak-Toyok, chako (Southeast Asian)
 Three-section staff (Okinawan, Chinese))
 Two-section staff, xhang xiao ban, could also be considered a polearm (Chinese)

Chains and ropes
Having a heavy object attached to a flexible chain or rope. Wielded by swinging, throwing, or projecting the end, as well as wrapping, striking, and blocking with the chain or rope, sometimes attached to another type of weapon.

 Chigiriki (Japanese)
 Cumberjung, double ended flail, flail with quoits (Indian)
 Flail, fleau d'armes, kriegsflegel (European)
 Flying claws (Chinese)
 Flying guillotine (Chinese)
 Kusari-fundo, manrikigusari, manriki (Japanese)
 Kusari-gama (Japanese)
 Kyoketsu-shoge (Japanese)
 Lasso, uurga, lariat (American, Chinese)
 Meteor hammer, dragon's fist, dai chui, flying hammer, sheng bao, liu xing chui (Chinese)
 Rope dart, jouhyou, rope javelin, sheng biao (Japanese, Chinese)
 Monkey's fist (Improvised, European, Japanese, Chinese)
 Surujin, suruchin (Okinawan)

Defensive weapons

Shields and body armour

Shields
Used not only to block strikes and missiles but also swung outwardly (or in quick upward motions) to strike an opponent. Also used to rush an opponent (known as shield bashing). Some shields had spikes, sharp edges, or other offensive designs.

 Aspis, oplon (Greek)
 Buckler (European)
 Clipeus (Roman, Greek)
 Dhal (Indian) 
 Gun shield (Roman, Egyptian, Greek)
 Heater shield, heraldic shield (European)
 Hide, wickerwork, leather and ceremonial shields (Tribal, Worldwide) 
 Hungarian shield (European)
 Ishlangu (African)
 Kite shield (European)
 Lantern shield (Italian)
 Parma, parmula (Roman)
 Peltarion (Greek)
 Rattan shield (Korean, Chinese)
 Round shield
 Scuta, rectangular, tower and oval scutum (Roman)
 Targe (European)
 Nguni shield (African)
 Chīmalli (American)

Armour parts

 Enarmes
 Guige

See also

 List of martial arts weapons
 List of medieval weapons
 List of practice weapons

Swords

 List of Japanese swords
 List of National Treasures of Japan (crafts: swords)
 List of Wazamono
 List of fictional swords
 List of legendary swords
 List of historical swords
 Classification of swords
 List of types of swords

References

Weapons by period
Lists of weapons